Parade is the self-titled debut studio album by British girl group Parade. The album was released on 11 November 2011, by Asylum Records. It missed the top 100 of the UK Albums Chart, charting at No. 171 which led to the band being dropped from the record label.

Singles
Two singles were released from the album, the first being "Louder" which was released on 7 March 2011. It debuted at number ten on the UK Singles Chart, and also charted at number 41 in Ireland. "Perfume" was released on 17 June 2011 as the album's second single. The song peaked lower than its previous single reaching number thirty-eight on the UK Singles Chart.

Track listing

Chart positions

References

2011 debut albums
Asylum Records albums
Pop albums by English artists